The women's individual recurve open archery discipline at the 2020 Summer Paralympics will be contested from 27 August to 2 September. 

In the ranking rounds each archer shoots 72 arrows, and is seeded according to score. In the knock-out stages each archer shoots three arrows per set against an opponent, the scores being aggregated. Losing semifinalists compete in a bronze medal match.

Ranking round
The ranking round of the women's individual recurve open event was held on 27 August.

Elimination rounds
The elimination round took place on 2 September 2021.

Top half

Bottom half

Finals

References

Archery at the 2020 Summer Paralympics